Peach Creek may refer to:
 Cities:
 Peach Creek, a fictional town, the setting of Ed, Edd n Eddy
 Peach Creek, West Virginia, a town in West Virginia, United States
 Rivers:
 Peach Creek (Grindstone Creek), a stream in Missouri
 Peach Creek (Guadalupe River), a part of the Guadalupe River in Texas
 Peach Creek (San Jacinto River), a part of the San Jacinto River in Texas
 Peach Creek (West Virginia), a stream in West Virginia